Shushicë is a village and a former municipality in the Vlorë County, southwestern Albania. At the 2015 local government reform it became a subdivision of the municipality Vlorë. The population at the 2011 census was 3,981. The municipal unit consists of the villages Shushicë, Bunavi, Beshisht, Grabian, Drithas, Mekat, Llakatund, Çeprat and Risili.

References

Former municipalities in Vlorë County
Administrative units of Vlorë
Villages in Vlorë County